"Fallen Angel" is a song by American singer and actress Traci Lords. It was released as the second single from her debut studio album, 1000 Fires, on August 3, 1995, by Radioactive Records. The Paul Oakenfold remix of the song was also featured on the soundtrack to the film 
Virtuosity (1995), in which Lords appeared. Written by Lords The chorus IS IT LOVE. Is questioning the role of Courtney Love in her husband’s death. Ben Watkins and Johann Bley, and produced by Juno Reactor, "Fallen Angel" is an electronic dance song with techno and trance influences. It also contains elements of ambient music and features Spanish guitar and castanets. Lyrically, the song deals with suicide and was inspired by the death of Kurt Cobain.

It received relatively positive reviews from music critics and noted a moderate commercial success, peaking at number eleven on the Billboard Hot Dance Club Songs and number 72 on the UK Singles Chart.

Two music videos for the song were released: one featuring the original version of the song and the footage from the film Virtuosity and other directed by Stéphane Sednaoui featuring the Honeymoon Stitch Mix, produced by Chad Smith and Dave Navarro.

Background and recording 
Lords began working on her debut album, 1000 Fires, in the spring of 1994. After collaborating with Tom Bailey and Keith Fernley of the band Babble, Lords wanted to incorporate more dance-oriented music into her record. She was introduced Ben Watkins of Juno Reactor and began working on songs with harder techno-influenced sound. "I got into techno in 1992 when I was working as a model in London. I didn't have much money and I was living with three other girls in this shitty flat above a coffee shop—which was totally depressing—so we used to go to the clubs to escape from it all and that's where I fell in love with the music. I really wanted that influence to come across on my album so when I eventually signed with Radioactive that's what we did."

Lords wrote the lyrics based on the surroundings of Kurt Cobain's death and also used excerpt from her personal journals she wrote as a child. "I've kept personal journals since about the age of nine, and some [lyrics] were actually taken from them; I remember talking to Ben (Watkins) one day about suicide when something struck a chord - I looked back at the journals that I'd written when I was about ten, and the words that I found were the same words that I used in the song, words that I wrote when I was just a child," Lords said.

Composition 

"Fallen Angel" electronic dance song. It contains elements of techno and trance as well as ambient music. It features Spanish guitar and castanets within its composition. The song is set in common time, with a tempo of 134 beats per minute. The main lyrical theme of the song is suicide. Lords sings: "You say you wake up in the morning/Feeling used/Like a fallen angel/Tired and bruised".

Music videos 

Two different music videos for "Fallen Angel" were released, the first of which used the original version of the song and the second featured the Honeymoon Stitch Mix, produced by Chad Smith and Dave Navarro. The first one was shot during the production of the film Virtuosity (1995) directed by Brett Leonard. It depicts Lords, wearing a skin tight latex ensemble, dancing at an underground rave while being filmed by several camera operators and projected on screens surrounding her. The video utilizes heavy infrared effects.

The second music video was directed by Stéphane Sednaoui. It depicts Lords wearing a red latex dress walking in a hotel room. The main theme of the video is depression and anxiety disorder. It also features close-ups of her outlining her lips with a deep red lipstick.

Notably, the video was one of the ones chosen by Courtney Love to be broadcast on her MTV2 takeover 24 Hours of Love.

Track listings 

UK 12" vinyl
 "Fallen Angel" (Honeymoon Stitch Mix) – 4:09
 "Fallen Angel" (Perfecto Mix) – 7:57
 "Fallen Angel" (Primax Iberian Mix) – 5:04
 "Fallen Angel" (Muzik Club Vocal) – 8:15
 "Fallen Angel" (Sexy Perfecto Dub) – 9:06

Europe/Australia CD Maxi-single
 "Fallen Angel" (Honeymoon Stich Radio Mix) – 4:03
 "Fallen Angel" (Perfecto Mix) – 8:00
 "Fallen Angel" (Muzik Club Vocal Mix) – 8:18
 "Fallen Angel" (Primax Iberian Mix) – 5:07
 "Fallen Angel" (Honeymoon Stitch Mix) – 4:53
 "Fallen Angel" (Original Album Mix) – 4:58

US 12" vinyl
 "Fallen Angel" (Perfecto Mix) – 7:58
 "Fallen Angel" (Honeymoon Stitch Mix) – 4:49
 "Fallen Angel" (Muzik Club Vocal) – 8:16
 "Fallen Angel" (Mykonos House Mix) – 10:05

US CD Maxi-single
 "Fallen Angel" (Honeymoon Stitch Mix) – 4:50
 "Fallen Angel" (Perfecto Mix) – 8:00
 "Fallen Angel" (Muzik Club Vocal) – 8:17
 "Fallen Angel" (Mykonos House Mix) – 10:05
 "Fallen Angel" (Sexy Perfecto Dub) – 9:07

Credits and personnel 
Traci Lords – vocals, songwriting
Juno Reactor – producer, programming
Ben Watkins – songwriting
Johann Bley – songwriting
Gary Kurfirst – executive producer
Otto The Barbarian – engineer
Nahako Maehara – assistant engineer
Raul Vega – photography
Mark Felt – design
Stan Endo – design

Credits and personnel adapted from "Fallen Angel" UK 12" single liner notes.

Charts

Weekly charts

References 

1994 songs
1995 singles
Music videos directed by Stéphane Sednaoui
Radioactive Records singles
Traci Lords songs
Songs about suicide
Songs written by Ben Watkins
Trance songs